Mohamed Amer (born 18 December 1997) is an Egyptian fencer. He competed in the men's sabre event at the 2016 Summer Olympics, losing his only match. He also competed at the 2020 Summer Olympics in the men's sabre event and the men's sabre team event.

References

External links
 

1997 births
Living people
Egyptian male sabre fencers
Olympic fencers of Egypt
Fencers at the 2016 Summer Olympics
Fencers at the 2020 Summer Olympics
Sportspeople from Cairo
20th-century Egyptian people
21st-century Egyptian people
Mediterranean Games competitors for Egypt
Competitors at the 2022 Mediterranean Games